From March 14 to May 19, 1944, voters of the Democratic Party chose its nominee for president in the 1944 United States presidential election. The very popular incumbent President Franklin D. Roosevelt was selected as the nominee through a series of primary elections and caucuses culminating in the 1944 Democratic National Convention held from July 19 to July 21, 1944, in Chicago, Illinois.

See also
1944 Republican Party presidential primaries
White primary

References